Hugging Face, Inc. is a French company that develops tools for building applications using machine learning. It is most notable for its Transformers library built for natural language processing applications and its platform that allows users to share machine learning models and datasets.

History 
The company was founded in 2016 by French entrepreneurs Clément Delangue, Julien Chaumond, and Thomas Wolf originally as a company that developed a chatbot app targeted at teenagers. After open-sourcing the model behind the chatbot, the company pivoted to focus on being a platform for democratizing machine learning.

In March 2021, Hugging Face raised $40 million in a Series B funding round.

On April 28, 2021, the company launched the BigScience Research Workshop in collaboration with several other research groups to release an open large language model. In 2022, the workshop concluded with the announcement of BLOOM, a multilingual large language model with 176 billion parameters.

On December 21, 2021, the company announced its acquisition of Gradio, a software library used to make interactive browser demos of machine learning models.

On May 5, 2022, the company announced its Series C funding round led by Coatue and Sequoia. The company received a $2 billion valuation.

On May 13, 2022, the company introduced its Student Ambassador Program to help fulfill its mission to teach machine learning to 5 million people by 2023.

On May 26, 2022, the company announced a partnership with Graphcore to optimize its Transformers library for the Graphcore IPU.

On August 3, 2022, the company announced the Private Hub, an enterprise version of its public Hugging Face Hub that supports SaaS or on-premise deployment.

In February 2023, the company announced partnership with Amazon Web Services (AWS) which would allow Hugging Face's products available to AWS customers to use them as the building blocks for their custom applications. The company also said the next generation of BLOOM will be run on Trainium, a proprietary machine learning chip created by AWS.

Services and technologies

Transformers Library 
The Transformers library is a Python package that contains open-source implementations of transformer models for text, image, and audio tasks. It is compatible with the PyTorch, TensorFlow and JAX deep learning libraries and includes implementations of notable models like BERT and GPT.

Hugging Face Hub 
The Hugging Face Hub is a platform where users can share pre-trained models, datasets, and demos of machine learning projects. The Hub contains GitHub-inspired features for code-sharing and collaboration, including discussions and pull requests for projects. It also hosts Hugging Face Spaces, a hosted service that allows users to build web-based demos of machine learning apps using the Gradio or Streamlit.

Other Libraries 
In addition to Transformers and the Hugging Face Hub, the Hugging Face ecosystem contains libraries for other tasks, such as dataset processing ("Datasets"), model evaluation ("Evaluate"), simulation ("Simulate"), machine learning demos ("Gradio").

References 

Machine learning
Open-source artificial intelligence
Privately held companies based in New York City
American companies established in 2016